Hafner Grocery Warehouse is a historic commercial warehouse located at Hannibal, Marion County, Missouri.  It was built about 1910, and is a three-story brick structure on a concrete foundation. It features seven bays of segmental-arched windows and a corbelled parapet.

It was added to the National Register of Historic Places in 1986.

References

Commercial buildings on the National Register of Historic Places in Missouri
Commercial buildings completed in 1910
Buildings and structures in Hannibal, Missouri
National Register of Historic Places in Marion County, Missouri
Grocery store buildings
Warehouses on the National Register of Historic Places